Skylab Four may refer to:

Skylab 4 (SL-4), the fourth Skylab mission
Skylab 5 (SLM-4), the fourth manned Skylab mission
Skylab IV,  a 2003 album by Rogério Skylab

See also
Skylab (disambiguation)
Skylab One (disambiguation)
Skylab Two (disambiguation)
Skylab Three (disambiguation)